Niksen is a Dutch verb which means "doing nothing", which can be roughly translated as "nixing". It has been explored as a method to combat work-related health problems such as stress and burnout.

References

Dutch words and phrases
Occupational stress